Cerithiopsis krisbergi is a species of sea snail, a gastropod in the family Cerithiopsidae. It was described by Rolan, Espinosa and Fernandez-Garcés, in 2007.

References

krisbergi
Gastropods described in 2007